Manuel Schäffler (born 6 February 1989) is a German professional footballer who plays as a striker for German  side Dynamo Dresden.

Career
Schäffler was born in Fürstenfeldbruck. In summer 2016, he joined 3. Liga side Wehen Wiesbaden.

On 21 July 2022, Schäffler signed a two-year contract with Dynamo Dresden.

Career statistics

References

External links
 

1989 births
Living people
Association football forwards
German footballers
Germany youth international footballers
TSV 1860 Munich players
TSV 1860 Munich II players
MSV Duisburg players
FC Ingolstadt 04 players
Holstein Kiel players
SV Wehen Wiesbaden players
1. FC Nürnberg players
Dynamo Dresden players
2. Bundesliga players
3. Liga players